Benigno Dungo Perez (born November 27, 1990), popularly known as Ion Perez, is a Filipino actor, model, and television host. He is best known as the Kuya Escort in the Miss Q and A segment of It's Showtime.

He is a regular host on ABS-CBN's noontime variety show It's Showtime.

Early life
Perez is the 11th of 15 siblings with his father a jeepney driver and his mother a kakanin vendor. According to some of his interviews from the past, he was bullied when he was younger because of his lanky frame. As a response, he motivated himself to get fit and take care of himself.

He used to help his parents run a poultry shop inside a wet market. After developing muscles, Perez often went shirtless as a marketing tactic to help draw in customers to his parents' stall.

Career
Perez works as a model having been featured in the bachelors list of Cosmopolitan Philippines fashion magazine. He also participated in pageants. Perez was among the winners of the 2017 Misters of Filipinas and was the winner of the 2018 Mister Universe Tourism. His victories in pageants led him to more opportunities in his modelling career. He was initially hesitant to join pageants. It took three years of convincing from his manager for him to enter pageants.

Perez first joined ABS-CBN's It's Showtime in September 2018 to audition for the "Kuya Escort" role. He secured the role and eventually became a co-host in the show.

Personal life 
On October 19, 2021, Perez and Vice Ganda had a commitment ceremony at The Little Vegas Chapel in Las Vegas, Nevada. In 2018, he first appeared on It's Showtime, but already previously worked with Vice on the latter’s talk show, Gandang Gabi Vice.

Filmography

Television

Film

References

External links

1990 births
Living people
Filipino television presenters
Filipino television variety show hosts
Filipino male models
Male actors from Metro Manila
Star Magic
Male actors from Manila
Filipino LGBT actors

Filipino male comedians